KHZK (103.9 FM) was a radio station licensed to serve Kotzebue, Alaska.  The station was owned by Horizon Christian Fellowship.  It aired a religious radio format.

The station had been assigned these call letters by the Federal Communications Commission (FCC) since March 29, 2006.

The station was started and operated by Keith and Kelly Kendall, from Julian, California.

The station's license was cancelled by the FCC on May 13, 2013.

References

External links
KHZK official website

Keith & Kelly Kendall Serving the Lord in Kotzebue, Alaska

HZK
Culture of the Arctic
Defunct radio stations in the United States
Radio stations disestablished in 2013
Defunct religious radio stations in the United States
2013 disestablishments in Alaska
HZK